Karchegan (also Romanized as Karchegān) is a village in Keraj Rural District, in the Central District of Isfahan County, Isfahan Province, Iran. At the 2006 census, its population was 781, in 179 families.

References 

Populated places in Isfahan County